Access (also known as AXS) is a Japanese pop group. Its members are Daisuke Asakura and Hiroyuki Takami. Asakura is the primary composer/producer and featured keyboardist while Takami is the vocalist. Takami also writes a major portion of access' lyrics. Access is currently signed with Sony Music Associated Records. The name "access" is stylized in lowercase letters.

History
Access was formed after Hiroyuki Takami performed in some of Daisuke Asakura's solo work as a guest vocalist in 1991. The unit's career officially began in 1992. The duo went on to record three albums and attain significant popularity before announcing their breakup in 1995 for ambiguous reasons. In 2002, however, they reunited with much fanfare, and have remained active since.

"AXS" is their written nickname. While spelled "AXS", it is actually not an "X" but two inwardly-turned arrows ("A-><-S"). The nickname was coined by Takami. It first appeared on the group's debut album, Fast Access, on the last page of the lyrics book. "AXS" replaced the group's name on their third single "Naked Desire." The logo has many variations depending on its use. There is only one album that has "AXS" credited as the group's name: AXS Remix Best Tracks. In all of their albums from 1993 to 1995 song production was credited as "songs by AXS". Before their reunion in 2002, the logo and nickname have not been used, except as credits for remixed songs on the album and tour DVDs of "Crossbridge". In 2006, for the "blanc and rouge" tour, "AXS" reappeared in the tour logo interwoven in the design of a coat of arms.

In 2007, after the Virginia Tech massacre, access produced the song "Shadow over the world" in dedication to the memory of the victims. The song was released on the album "binary engine" and had its live debut during their summer tour of that same year.

Access performed the opening theme for Code Geass: Lelouch of the Rebellion Stages 24 & 25, "Hitomi no Tsubasa", and did the third opening theme for D.Gray-Man, "Doubt & Trust" (2007). In July 2008, their single "Dream Runner" was featured as the opening theme of the TV drama series, Here is Greenwood. In 2009, Access was indirectly featured in a musical rendition of Goodbye Charlie with Takami portraying one of the lead roles and Asakura having composed and directed the music. Their single "Bet～追憶のRoulette～" was featured as an ending theme for Fuji TV's series Sukimono from 30 July 2012 to 27 August 2012. Access was also featured in Fuji TV's event live, "FNSうたの夏まつり" ("FNS Summer Festival of Song" - 8 August 2012) doing a cover of TM Network's song, "Be Together", with Tetsuya Komuro.

Discography

Singles
 [26 November 1992] Virgin Emotion
 Virgin Emotion
 Be Nude
 [25 January 1993] Jewelry Angel
 Jewelry Angel
 Against The Rules
 Virgin Emotion(Instrumental Mix)
 [26 May 1993] Naked Desire
 Naked Desire
 Every Time You
 Jewelry Angel (Instrumental Mix)
 [25 August 1993] Moonshine Dance
 Moonshine Dance
 Lyin' Eyes
 Naked Desire (Instrumental Mix)
 [8 December 1993] Try Again
 Try Again
 Jungling Party
 Moonshine Dance (Instrumental Mix)
 [26 January 1994] 夢を見たいから (Yume Wo Mitaikara)
 夢を見たいから
 Us
 Try Again (Instrumental Mix)
 [27 April 1994] Misty Heartbreak
 Misty Heartbreak
 Stoned Merge
 夢を見たいから (Instrumental Mix)
 [25 May 1994] Sweet Silence
 Sweet Silence
 Decade & XXX
 [19 August 1994] Drastic Mermaid
 Drastic Mermaid
 Sequence Meditation～超電導思考回路　第一楽章　覚醒
 Sweet Silence (Instrumental Mix)
 [25 August 1994] Drastic Mermaid Re-sync Style
 [19 October 1994] Scandalous Blue
 Scandalous Blue
 Sequence Meditation～超電導思考回路　第二楽章　混乱
 Drastic Mermaid (Instrumental Mix)
 [26 October 1994] Scandalous Blue Re-sync Style
 [7 December 1994] Tear's Liberation
 Tear's Liberation
 Sequence Meditation～超電導思考回路　第三楽章　解放
 Scandalous Blue (Instrumental Mix)
 [14 December 1994] Tear's Liberation Re-sync Style
 [23 January 2002] Only the love survive
 Only the love survive
 Look-a-Head <from Live before next at Yokohama Arena 1994 December 19>
 [27 February 2002] Edge
 Edge
 Especially Kiss
 [19 February 2003] Real at Night ～眠れぬ夜の向こうに～ (Real at Night ~Nemurenu Yoru No Muko Ni~)
 Real at Night ～眠れぬ夜の向こうに～
 [31 January 2007] Diamond Cycle
 Stay
 Bright Sight
 Inner Cycle
 Catch the Rainbow
 [18 July 2007] 瞳ノ翼 (Hitomi No Tsubasa)
 瞳ノ翼
 瞳ノ翼（TV size version）
 瞳ノ翼（Instrumental）
 [31 October 2007] Doubt & Trust　～ダウト＆トラスト～
 Doubt & Trust　～ダウト＆トラスト～
 Gonna Be
 Doubt & Trust ～ダウト&トラスト～　（Instrumental）
 [27 August 2008] Dream Runner
 Dream Runner
 Paradise
 Dream Runner (TV version)
 Dream Runner (Instrumental)
 [28 July 2010] Higher Than Dark Sky
 Version A
 Higher Than Dark Sky
 アオイナミ (Aoi Nami)
 SOUL DYNAMITE
 Version B
 Higher Than Dark Sky
 SOUL DYNAMITE (original live)
 アオイナミ (original live)
 [3 August 2011] Share The Love
 Version A
 Share The Love
 KEEP IT
 Ride Up for the Shiny Way
 Version B
 Share The Love
 KEEP IT (2010 Version)
 Higher Than Dark Sky (Piano Version)
 [4 April 2012] Wild Butterfly
 Wild Butterfly
 Beyond the Second-D.
 ChaOs GrAdatioN
 [11 July 2012] Bet～追憶のRoulette～
 Bet～追憶のRoulette～
 Let Me Go
 Bet～追憶のRoulette～ (Instrumental)

Albums
 [25 April 1993] Fast Access
 Sensual Glide
 Virgin Emotion
 Pale Blue Rain
 Jewelry Angel (Deep AXS Mix)
 Distance~Motomeauniwa Tosugite~
 Hot Cruising Night (Original AXS)
 Against the Rules
 Can-Dee Graffiti
 Be Nude
 Perfect Timing
 Look-A-Head
 [22 September 1993] ACCESS II
 [25 May 1994] DELICATE PLANET
 Silver Heart
 Misty Heartbreak -West Side Mix-
 Yume wo mitai kara -West Side Mix-
 Stay My Love
 Stoned Merge -West Side Mix-
 Pink Junktion
 Regret
 Decade & XXX
 Sweet Silence -West Side Mix-
 Try Again -West Side Mix-
 Find New Way
 Beat Planet
 [15 March 1995] Live Ones Sync - Across Japan Tour '93-'94
 [15 March 1995] Live Zeros Sync - Across Japan Tour '93-'94
 [1 October 1995] AXS Single Tracks
 [25 March 1996] AXS REMIX BEST TRACKS (Remix Album)
 [23 June 1999] Sync - Beat Box -893 Days-
 [20 March 2002] CROSSBRIDGE
 "born a cross"(instruments)
 Shake the Sunrise
 Only the love survive ～PK mix～
 Jewelry Angel 2002 ～Platonic Eye～
 Moonshine Dance 2002 ～Return to Star～
 夢を見たいから 2002 ～Soul The Future Love～
 777 trois seven
 Against the Rules 2002 ～AA trance～
 Grand Muse
 EDGE ～PK mix～
 "cross a bridge"(instruments)
 [5 February 2003] Rippin' Ghost
 -a-bstract Ghost
 Kiss My -a- Soul
 Break Through The Big Town
 White Lights
 Real at Night ～眠れぬ夜の向こうに～
 Fly High,Fly Away ～In-Comer Android～
 balearic Ghost
 View
 Ozone,In the Native
 Another Day
 Hung Me for the Distance　～絆された愛の果てに～
 [9 April 2003] Re-sync Ghost (Remix Album)
 Real at Night (truancy mix)
 Real at Night (knockin'barrier mix)
 White Lights (lovely'snowy'mix)
 White Lights (deep valentine mix)
 Hung Me for the Distance (pascal talk mix)
 Hung Me for the Distance (preservative mix)
 Fly High,Fly Away In-Comer Android (extended dub mix)
 Ozone, In the Native (extended dub mix)
 [31 January 2007] diamond cycle
 Stay
 Bright Sight
 Inner Cycle
 Catch the Rainbow
 [4 July 2007] binary engine
 Awake
 closet
 Life goes on
 Wild in the desert
 Summer Night Breezer
 biologic engine（Instrumental）
 Gone too Soon
 Shadow over the world
 High and Scream
 瞳ノ翼～binary version
 [21 November 2007] access best selection
Disc 1
 Virgin Emotion
 Jewelry Angel
 Naked Desire
 Moonshine Dance
 Try Again
 夢を見たいから
 Mysty Heartbreak
 Sweet Silence
 Drastic Mermaid
 Scandalous Blue
 Tear's Liberation
 Only the love survive
 Edge
 Real at Night ～眠れぬ夜の向こうに～
 瞳ノ翼
 Doubt & Trust ～ダウト&トラスト～
Disc 2
 Sequence Meditation ～超電導思考回路　第一楽章　覚醒～
 Find New Way
 Be Nude
 Lyin' Eyes （Crossbridge ver. 2002）
 Stoned Merge （blanc and rouge ver.2006）
 Decade & ×××（Summer Style ver.2002）
 Beat Planet （binary engine ver.2007）
 Shake the Sunrise
 Against the Rules 2002 ～AA trance～
 Hung Me for the Distance　～絆された愛の果てに～
 balearic Ghost
 Stay
 Life goes on
 Stay My Love
Disc 3
 Summer Night Breezer
 closet
 Especially Kiss
 White Lights
 Pale Blue Rain
 Jungling party
 Night Wave
 Against the Rules
 Silver Heart （binary engine version 2007）
 Catch the Rainbow
 View
 Ozone in the Native
 Grand Muse
 Look-A-Head
[22 August 2012] Secret Cluster
All Versions (Disc 1)
 vibe cluster (Instrumental）
 Bet ~追憶のRoulette~ Album ver.
 Beyond the Second-D.
 Star Tribal 
 Let me go
 Stand By
 ChaOs GrAdatioN
 f☆R☆E☆e
 Wild Butterfly Album ver.
 Secret Dimension (Instrumental）
 20th Sincerely
Version A, Disc 2: 2007–2011 Singles Collection
 Doubt & Trust ～ダウト＆トラスト～
 GONNA BE
 Dream Runner
 PARADISE
 Higher Than Dark Sky
 アオイナミ
 SOUL DYNAMITE
 Share The Love
 Keep It
 Ride Up for the Shiny Way
Version B, Disc 2: DVD - access COUNTDOWN LIVE 2011-2012 LIVE DIGEST
[5 December 2012] Re-Sync Cluster (Remix Album)
 Wild Butterfly Digital Ageha Re-Sync Style (remixed by Daisuke Asakura)
 Beyond the Second-D. S'capade Remix (remixed by Shinnosuke - SOUL'd OUT)
 Stand By Deep Air Re-Sync Style (remixed by Daisuke Asakura)
 Wild Butterfly Digital Spider Remix (Remixed by YOW-ROW/GARI)
 ChaOs GrAdatioN External Re-Sync (Remixed by Kensuke Ushio/agraph)
 Bet ~追憶のRoulette~ Demon Angel Re-Sync Style (Remixed by Daisuke Asakura)
[20 December 2017] Heart Mining
 Cassini (Instrumental)
 Crack Boy
 Vertical Innocence (Heart Mining Ver.)
 Inside me, Inside you
 Tragedy
 Discover Borderless
 Knock beautiful smile (Heart Mining Ver.)
 Friend Mining
 Heart Mining
 Voyager (Instrumental)
 永遠dive (Heart Mining Ver.)

DVD
 [20 March 1993] Fast Access Looking 4 Reflexions
 [18 October 1993] SECOND Access Looking 4 ReflexionsII
 [9 February 1994] Live Reflexions Access To Second
 [2 June 1994] Looking 4 Reflexions III Delicate Planet
 [19 December 1994] Looking 4 Reflexions IV Sequence Meditation
 [1 March 1995] Live Reflexions II Sync-Across Japan Tour '94 Delicate Planet Arena Style
 [21 August 2002] Access Tour 2002 "Crossbridge" Live at Tokyo International Forum
 [19 March 2003] Access Live Sync - Across 2002 "Summer Style" Live at Nippon Budokan
 [26 March 2008] access 15TH Anniversary DVD Box

Live performances
 [20 March 1993 ~ 16 April 1993] 1993 Fast access Tour '93
 [18 October 1993 ~ 28 December 1993] 1993 Sync-Across Japan Tour '93 Access to Second
 [2 June 1994 ~ 2 September 1994] 1994 Sync-Across Japan Tour '94 Delicate Planet
 [12 December 1994 ~ 19 December 1994] 1994 Sync-Across Japan Tour '94 Delicate Planet Arena Style
 [23 April 2002 ~ 26 May 2002] access Tour 2002 Crossbridge
 [27 August 2002 ~ 28 August 2002] access Tour 2002 "Summer Style"
 [4 April 2003 ~ 1 June 2003] access Tour 2003 -Livin' Ghost
 [1 July 2005 ~ 10 July 2005] access Tour 2005 Catch The Summer
 [30 July 2005 ~ 20 August 2005] access Joint 2005 -Film,Talk and Live Event-
 [5 April 2006 ~ 21 April 2006] access Tour 2006 "blanc" and "rouge"
 [7 February 2007 ~ 7 March 2007] access Tour 2007 diamond cycle
 [29 July 2007 ~ 25 August 2007] access Tour 2007 -binary engine- ~Zepp Version~
 [6 July 2007 ~ 10 September 2007] access Tour 2007 -binary engine- ~Hall version~
 [12 July 2008 ~ 4 August 2008] access Tour 2008 -We are access-
 [25 July 2009 ~ 14 August 2009] access Tour 2009 SUMMER STYLE
 [31 July 2010 ~ 29 August 2010] access Tour 2010 STREAM
 [8 August ~ 28 August 2011] access Tour 2011 OPERATION CONNECT
 [11 March ~ 4 April 2012] access 20th Anniversary CLUB TOUR 2012 minimum CLUSTER
 [14 July ~ 24 August 2012] access 20th Anniversary TOUR 2012 MEGA cluster

External links
  

Japanese musical duos
Japanese pop music groups
Japanese power pop groups
Japanese electropop groups
Sony Music Entertainment Japan artists
Musical groups from Tokyo